Vache Artashesi Hovsepyan (sometimes credited as Vatche Hovsepian; 17 September 1925 – 1 December 1978) was an Armenian duduk player and renowned popular artist.

He graduated from the Yerevan Conservatory in the name of Romanos Melikyan in 1951. He had started performing as a popular musician on Yerevan radio in 1945 in Armenian popular and folk music. He has composed music for songs like «Էստոնական Երգ» (lyrics by Vahan Terian), «Իրիկնաժամին» (lyrics by Silva Kaputikyan) and «Երեքնուկ» (lyrics by Paruyr Sevak) and others. He also toured in live performances in Armenia, the Soviet Union and worldwide.

With Andranik Askarian, he performed the duduk parts on "The Feeling Begins", the opening track of Peter Gabriel's Passion, the soundtrack album from Martin Scorsese's film The Last Temptation of Christ. The duduk recording is actually an excerpt from a song titled "The Wind Subsides", originally recorded for a collection of Armenian music released by Radio France's Ocora label.

References

External links
 Vatche Hovsepian Armenian Sound Network

1925 births
1978 deaths
Armenian musicians
Woodwind musicians
Dudukahars